Mount Sceberras is a hill in Valletta, Malta. that rises 56m above the Grand Harbour to the south and Marsamxett Harbour to the north. It is upon this hill that the Grand Master of the Order of Malta, Jean Parisot de Valette commissioned the construction of the new city of Valletta in 1566 after the Great Siege of Malta.

This hill gives its name to the Sciberras Peninsula.

See also 
 Sciberras Peninsula
 Valletta
 Floriana

References

Bibliography 

Hills of Malta